Kastorensky District is an administrative and municipal district (raion), one of the twenty-eight in Kursk Oblast, Russia. It is located in the east of the oblast. Its administrative center is the urban locality (a work settlement) of Kastornoye. Population:  24,237 (2002 Census);  The population of Kastornoye accounts for 24.1% of the district's total population.

Geography
Kastorensky District is located in the east of Kursk Oblast, on the border with Voronezh to the east and Lipetsk Oblast to the north.   The terrain is hilly plain averaging 200 meters above sea level; the district lies on the Central Russian Upland.   The main river in the district is the Veduga River, which has its source in the district, and is ultimately a feeder to the Don River (Russia) basin.   The district is 110 km east of the city of Kursk, 45 km west of the city of Voronezh, and 440 km south of Moscow.  The area measures 30 km (north-south), and 40 km (west-east).  The administrative center is the town of Kastornoye.

The district is bordered on the north by Volovsky District, Lipetsk Oblast, on the east by Semiluksky District of Voronezh Oblast, on the south by Gorshechensky District, and on the west by Sovetsky District.

References

Notes

Sources

External links
Kastorensky District on Google Maps
Kastorensky District on OpenStreetMap
Beduga River, On OpenStreetMap

Districts of Kursk Oblast